Interstate 369 may refer to:

Interstate 369 (Texas), a freeway in the United States
Interstate 369 (Kentucky), the former future designation of a section of the Western Kentucky Parkway in the United States

69-3
3